Walk of Fame is a 2017 comedy film. It premiered on March 24, 2017 and stars Scott Eastwood, Laura Ashley Samuels and Malcolm McDowell.

Plot 
Drew signs up for an acting class at the famous Star Academy in Hollywood after falling for aspiring actress Nikki. He gets more than he bargained for when he encounters an eccentric and volatile acting coach and the cast of crazy characters looking for their big break in Tinsel Town. Can Drew survive the insanity of the Star Academy and win Nikki's heart?

Cast 
 Scott Eastwood as Drew
 Chris Kattan as Alejandro
 Laura Ashley Samuels as Nikki
 Malcolm McDowell as Evan Polus
 Jamie Kennedy as Hugo
 Cory Hardrict as Nate
 Sam Lerner as Rowe
 Mikey Post as Teddy

Reception 
The film was poorly received by critics. Kimber Myers of the Los Angeles Times stated: "Aggressive and aggressively unfunny, Hollywood-set comedy "Walk of Fame" hates its characters and its audience - and the feeling is mutual."

References

External links 
 

2017 films
2017 comedy films